José María Vicente Esteban Rafael de Jesús Calderón Muñoz, known as Rafael Calderón Muñoz (October 24, 1869 – June 15, 1943) was a Costa Rican politician  and physician. He is cited as "one of the leaders of a circle of Catholic politicians with social concerns". Calderón Muñoz was vice president from 1940 until his death.

Biography
Born in San José, Costa Rica to Adolfo Calderón Calderón and María Muñoz y Vargas, he graduated in medicine, surgery and obstetrics at the Catholic University of Leuven, east of Brussels. Calderón Muñoz became a member of the Constituent Assembly in 1917. He was a member of the Senate and Consul of Costa Rica in Belgium. He was elected to the Constitutional Congress in 1930, and reelected ten years later.  He was President of the First Legislature from 1918–1919, and 1931–1932.

Calderón Muñoz held numerous administrative positions, including superintendent of Hospital San Juan de Dios and president of National Bank Insurance.

Married to Ana María, they were the parents of President Rafael Ángel Calderón Guardia, in 1940, Calderón Muñoz became one of the vice presidents of the country along with Teodoro Picado Michalski, Jorge Hine Saborío and Francisco Calderón Guardia, which he held until his death in 1943.

References

External links
Images

Vice presidents of Costa Rica
1869 births
1943 deaths
Government ministers of Costa Rica
People from San José, Costa Rica